Vilavilque (possibly from Aymara wila blood, blood-red, willk'i gap, "red gap") is a mountain in the Andes, about  high. On the Chilean side it is situated in the Arica y Parinacota Region, Parinacota Province, and on the Peruvian side it lies in the Tacna Region, Tacna Province, Palca District. Vilavilque lies southeast of Queñuta.

References 

Volcanoes of Peru
Volcanoes of Arica y Parinacota Region
Landforms of Tacna Region
Mountains of Peru
Mountains of Tacna Region